Johannes Daniel "Neil" Powell (born 28 June 1978) is a former South African Rugby Union player and currently the Director of Rugby of the Sharks. He is the former Head Coach of the South African national rugby sevens team.

References

1978 births
Living people
Blue Bulls players
Coaches of international rugby sevens teams
Commonwealth Games bronze medallists for South Africa
Commonwealth Games medallists in rugby sevens
Commonwealth Games rugby sevens players of South Africa
Free State Cheetahs players
Griquas (rugby union) players
Lions (United Rugby Championship) players
Rugby sevens players at the 2010 Commonwealth Games
Rugby union players from Windhoek
Rugby union scrum-halves
Sharks (rugby union) players
South Africa international rugby sevens players
South African rugby union coaches
South African rugby union players
University of the Free State alumni
Medallists at the 2010 Commonwealth Games